Downer Methodist Episcopal Church is located in Monroe Township in Gloucester County, New Jersey. The church was added to the National Register of Historic Places on October 14, 2010.

See also
National Register of Historic Places listings in Gloucester County, New Jersey

References

External links

Churches on the National Register of Historic Places in New Jersey
Churches in Gloucester County, New Jersey
Monroe Township, Gloucester County, New Jersey
National Register of Historic Places in Gloucester County, New Jersey
New Jersey Register of Historic Places